The 1975 Boise State Broncos football team represented Boise State University during the 1975 NCAA Division II football season, the eighth season of Bronco football (at the four-year level) and the third in the newly reorganized Division II. The Broncos were in their sixth year as members of the Big Sky Conference (and NCAA) and played their home games on campus at Bronco Stadium in Boise, Idaho.

Prior to the season, the stadium was expanded with an upper deck added to the east grandstand, which increased the permanent seating capacity to 20,000. Part of the original design, it had been delayed for five years due to high costs.

Season
Prior to the regular season finale at Idaho State, it was announced that the winner would gain one of the eight  BSU won by three to advance to

Playoffs
Invited again to the eight-team Division II playoffs, sixth ranked BSU hosted #5 Northern Michigan at Bronco Stadium in the quarterfinals on   conditions caused fourteen fumbles, nine by BSU, and the visitors won  Winless the previous season, the Wildcats went on to win the  they were led by sophomore quarterback  later a head coach in the NFL for 

It was the third consecutive year that the Broncos fell in the playoffs to the eventual national champion, and it was their last appearance in the D-II playoffs. Boise State won the Big Sky title in 1977 but could not participate in the playoffs because of a late regular season game, and they moved up to the new Division I-AA in 1978.  to the postseason in 1980 and won its only national title.

Knap departs
Two months later in January 1976, 61-year-old Knap moved south to Nevada-Las Vegas to replace Ron Meyer, who had left for SMU in Dallas. At the time, UNLV was also in Division II, but moved up to I-A in 1978; Knap led the Rebels for six seasons, through 1981. Jim Criner, the linebackers coach at Rose Bowl champion UCLA, was hired as BSU's next head coach in February 1976, and stayed through 1982.

Schedule

Roster

NFL Draft
Three Broncos were selected in the 1976 NFL Draft, which lasted seventeen rounds (487 selections).

References

External links
 Bronco Football Stats – 1975

Boise State
Boise State Broncos football seasons
Big Sky Conference football champion seasons
Boise State Broncos football